Educational organizations in Cherthala, India include multiple primary, secondary and tertiary institutions.

College of Engineering Cherthala 

College of Engineering Cherthala is affiliated to APJ Abdul Kalam Technological University (KTU) and Cochin University of Science and Technology (CUSAT), The college is approved by All India Council for Technical Education (AICTE). It is one of the leading technical institutions in Kerala. It opened in 2004. CEC has established excellence in the field of science and technology. CEC offers bachelor and master engineering courses in electronics, computer science, and electrical engineering.

Nair Service Society College 
NSS College, Cherthala, was founded by the Nair Service Society, led by the late Mannathu Padmanabhan.

This institution began as a Junior College in 1964. It was upgraded in 1968. Its first PG course was started in 1995.

The college has an active NCC Unit, three socially committed National Service Scheme Units and a sports and arts wing. Students won laurels in University examinations, youth festivals and athletic contests.

It offers Bachelor of Arts (English, Malayalam, History and Economics), Bachelor of science (Mathematics, Physics, Chemistry, Botany and Environment & Water Management), Master of Arts (Economics), Bachelor of Commerce and Master of Science in Mathematics. The college is affiliated to Kerala University.

Sree Narayana College 
SN College It was inaugurated in 1964 by the late Sri. R. Sankar, the founder-secretary of S.N. Trusts and then Chief Minister of Kerala. It began as a junior college and evolved into a full college, offering ten degree courses and two PG courses.

The college enrolls more than 2,500 students served by more than 90 faculty. Four NSS units are active in the college. A Population Education Club and a Women's Cell operate there. The NCC wing has had its cadets participate in Republic Day Parade. College sports teams have excelled, especially in Kabaddi and Kho-Kho.

Its degree coursesa are Bachelor of Arts (Malayalam, Politics, Philosophy, History and Economics), Bachelor of Science (Computer Science, Physics, Chemistry, Botany, Zoology and Geology), Master of Arts (Economics), Bachelor of Commerce and Master of Science (Botany, Zoology, Physics). The college is affiliated to Kerala University.

St. Michael's college 
St. Michael's college enrolls 1,700 students with 62 members on the teaching staff and 47 on the non-teaching staff.

Its degree courses are: Bachelor of Arts (Economics), Bachelor of Science (Physics, Chemistry and Zoology), Master of Arts (Economics) and Bachelor of Ccommerce. The college is affiliated to Kerala University.

KVM College of Engineering & Information Technology 

KVM College of Engineering & Information Technology opened in 2001.  It is approved by AICTE and is recognized by Cochin University of Science & Technology (CUSAT).

SNGM Institutions - Valamangalam, Thuravoor 
The Sree Narayana Guru Memorial Charitable and Educational (S.N.G.M.) Trust runs M.Ed. College, B.Ed. College, Teacher Training Institute, Polytechnic For Catering Technology, Pharmacy College, Arts & Science College, Senior Higher Secondary School and K.R. Gouriamma Engineering College For Women. The campus is situated in Valamangalam South village, 4 km east of Thuravoor-NH 47 junction. The institutions are affiliated with Kerala University.

St. Joseph's School of Pharmacy 
The school is situated near Cherthala.

ITIs, ITCs and nursing colleges 
 St. Joseph's ITI - Kurakanchanda, Thuravoor South
 S.B College of Engineering & ITC Munisif Court Junction, Cherthala
 Sobha ITC, K.R.Puram.P.O, Pallippuram
 KVM Nursing College - KVM Hospital Cherthala
 Sacred Heart Nursing College & Hospital - Mathilakam, Cherthala
 EXCEL ITC south of private bus stand near st. marys G.H.school Cherthala-688524 ph.0478-3251396

Co-operative Training Centre/College 
This institute is under the management of State Co-operative Union, Kerala. It offers a Junior diploma in co-operation (JDC) and a Higher Diploma in Co-operation & Business Management (HDC&BM). (Govt approved courses) Qualifications:
 JDC  requires SSLC (medium: Malayalam/English)
 HDC&BM  accepts any degree (medium: Malayalam/English)

Some seats are reserved for SC/ST, employees of co-operative societies and government departments.

Subjects include Co-operation, Types of Co-operative Societies and their functions, Co-operative Laws, Other Laws applicable to Co-operative Societies, Co-operative Audit, Rural Development Management, Banking Accountancy Software Applications. The curriculum includes field studies and viva voce.

Other educational institutes

MGEF (Mahathma Gandhi Education Foundation)
Mahathma Gandhi Education Foundation's had office is at Cherthala. MGEF conducts Information Technology Courses (Multimedia, Animation, Programming, .NET, CAD Engineering, Hardware Courses, Web Designing Courses etc.), Fire and Safety Courses, Fashion Technology, Modeling, Management Courses, Electronics and Electrical Engineering Courses. MGEF has franchises or study centers all over Kerala, Tamil Nadu, Karnataka, Andhra Pradesh and Madhya Pradesh. MGEF has international Offices in Bahrain and Saudi Arabia. MGEF provides 100% placement assistance through its Online Placement Cell and through its International Office at Bahrain and Saudi Arabia. MGEF Head Office is at Gandhi Bhavan, North of Devi Temple, Cherthala, Kerala.

Schools 
Schools in and around Cherthala:

 Technical Higher Secondary School, Cherthala
 Holy Family Higher secondary School, Muttom, Cherthala Town
 St. Anns Public School, Muttom, Cherthala 
 St. Joseph Public School, Pattanakad, Cherthala
 Little Flower School, 
 St. Francis xaviers L.P school chandiroor
 St. Mary's Girls High School, Near Pvt. Bus Stand, Cherthala
 Sree Narayana memorial Government Boys Higher secondary School, Cherthala
 SNDSY UPS, Sreekandeswaram, Panavally
 SNHSS, Sreekandeswaram, Panavally
 Government Girls Higher secondary School, Cherthala Town
 Govt. Sanskrit High School, Charamangalam, Kayippuram
 Our lady of mercy, aroor
 Sree Rajarajeshwari English medium school, Kandamangalam
 HSS Kandamangalam
 Government Polytechnic College, Xray Jn., Cherthala Town
 Government Lower Primary School, Cherthala Town
 Pattariya Samajam High School, Pallippuram, Cherthala -688541
 St. George's H.S. Thankey
 Govt.U.P.School Velliyakulam, Varanad P.O, Cherthala
 Govt.H.S.S Chandiroor
 Govt.H.S Aroor
 Govt. HSS Thevarvattom, Poochakkal P.O.
Al-Ameen Public school Chandiroor
 Bishop Moore Vidyapith
 Panickaveettil Sir Sebastian Public School, Vayalar, Cherthala (CBSE school)
 St. Theres'High school, near cher...-arookuty road, Manappuram
 Government L.P. School, Konattussery, Kadakkarappally P.O.
 St.Mary of Leuca English Medium School, Pallippuram, Cherthala-688541 (CBSE School)       
 Vaduthala Jama-ath Higher Secondary School - Arookutty
 Fr. Xavier Aresseril Memorial English Medium School, Arthunkal- 688530 (CBSE School)

References

Education in Alappuzha district